Camaegeria massai is a moth of the family Sesiidae. It is known from Tanzania and Kenya.

This species has a wingspan of 19–27 mm

References

Sesiidae
Moths described in 2012
Moths of Africa